The 2021–22 Texas A&M Aggies men's basketball team represented Texas A&M University during the 2021–22 NCAA Division I men's basketball season. The team was led by third-year head coach Buzz Williams and played their home games at Reed Arena in College Station, Texas as a member of the Southeastern Conference. The finished the season 27–13, 9–9 in SEC play to finish in a five-way tie for fifth place. As the No. 8 seed in the SEC tournament, they defeated Florida, Auburn, and Arkansas to advance to the championship game where they lost to Tennessee. They received an at-large bid to the National Invitation Tournament as a No. 1 seed. They defeated Alcorn State, Oregon, Wake Forest, and Washington State to advance to the NIT championship game, where they lost to Xavier.

Previous season 
In a season limited due to the ongoing COVID-19 pandemic, the Aggies finished the 2020–21 season 8–10, 2–8 in SEC play to finish in 13th place. They lost in the first round of the SEC tournament to Vanderbillt.

Offseason

Departures

Incoming transfers

Recruiting classes

2021 recruiting class

2022 recruiting class

Roster

Schedule and results

|-
!colspan=12 style=| Exhibition

|-
!colspan=12 style=| Non-conference regular season

|-
!colspan=12 style=| SEC regular season

|-
!colspan=12 style=|  SEC tournament

|-
!colspan=12 style="background:#500000;"| NIT

Source

See also
2021–22 Texas A&M Aggies women's basketball team

References

Texas A&M Aggies men's basketball seasons
Texas AandM Aggies
Texas AandM Aggies men's basketball
Texas AandM Aggies men's basketball
Texas A&M